Megan McCubbin (born 1995) is an English zoologist, conservationist, photographer and television presenter.

Biography 
McCubbin has dyslexia and took Environmental Studies at A-Level. A foundation year in Biological Science led her to study Zoology at the University of Liverpool.

In 2017 she hosted an episode of the BBC documentary series Undercover Tourist about the bear bile industry, and became a regular reporter on Al Jazeera's Earthrise programme. She presented an episode of Planet Defenders in which she investigated why protected sharks were being caught and sold as 'Rock Salmon'. With her stepfather Chris Packham, she has co-hosted Springwatch, Autumnwatch and Winterwatch on BBC Two since 2020. In 2021, Packham and McCubbin co-hosted Chris and Meg's Wild Summer for the BBC.

In May and June 2022, McCubbin presented Springwatch from the Kielder Forest, Hauxley Nature Reserve and Newcastle-upon-Tyne. In August 2022, she joined the presenting team on Animal Park, a 15-part series filmed at Longleat in Wiltshire and broadcast daily on BBC One and BBC Two.

Books

References

Living people
Alumni of the University of Liverpool
English zoologists
English conservationists
English television presenters
English naturalists
21st-century English writers
21st-century English women writers
1995 births
Scientists with dyslexia